Raymond Michael "Mickey" Lopez (born November 17, 1973) is a former Major League Baseball second baseman. Lopez played for the Seattle Mariners in the 2004 season. In six games, Lopez had one hit in four at bats, with one base on balls. He was a switch-hitter who threw right-handed.

Lopez attended Westminster Christian High School in Palmetto Bay, Florida and Florida State University. In 1994, he played collegiate summer baseball with the Orleans Cardinals of the Cape Cod Baseball League. He was selected by the Milwaukee Brewers in the 13th round of the 1995 MLB Draft.

See also
 List of Cuban Americans

References

External links

1973 births
Living people
Baseball players from Florida
Beloit Snappers players
El Paso Diablos players
Florida State Seminoles baseball players
Florida State University alumni
Fresno Grizzlies players
Helena Brewers players
Huntsville Stars players
Indianapolis Indians players
Iowa Cubs players
Leones del Caracas players
American expatriate baseball players in Venezuela
Louisville Redbirds players
Louisville RiverBats players
Major League Baseball second basemen
Orleans Firebirds players
Reading Phillies players
Seattle Mariners players
Stockton Ports players
Tacoma Rainiers players
West Tennessee Diamond Jaxx players